Żabka Polska (lit. "little frog") is a chain of convenience stores in Poland. There are around 9,000 stores across Poland, including at least 500 in Warsaw and over 340 in the Tricity area, as of June 2022. Some Żabka stores are located in the Czech Republic. The retail turnover was about €650 million in 2010. As of the 2022, Żabka has more than 15,5M clients.

Żabka was founded by entrepreneur Mariusz Świtalski in 1998 and in the same year opened its first seven stores in Poznań and Swarzędz. By October 2005, Żabka had 1,700 stores throughout Poland. In 2007, Żabka was acquired by Penta Investments. 

In December 2010, Penta sold the Czech operations of Żabka and its Koruna subsidiary to UK retail giant Tesco plc. The deal was closed in April 2011. In February 2011, Penta signed an agreement to sell the remaining Polish operations Żabka Polska, including the Freshmarket store format, to Mid Europa Partners. 

In 2016, Żabka underwent a rebranding. In February 2017, Mid Europa Partners closed a deal to sell Żabka for an undisclosed value (but estimated by analysts between €1 billion and €1.5 billion) to the Luxembourg based CVC Capital Partners.

In late 2022, Jaroslaw Kaczynski said that the Polish Law and Justice government might buy Żabka from CVC Capital Partners.

References

Further reading

External links
  (Poland)
  (Czech Republic)

Convenience stores
Retail companies established in 1998
Retail companies of Poland
Polish brands